Mateo Barać (born 20 July 1994) is a Croatian football defender who plays for Belgian club Oostende on loan from Krylia Sovetov Samara.

Club career

Early career
Born and raised in Sinj, Barać started his youth career at the local Junak Sinj. At the age of 17 he joined the Hajduk Split youth academy, winning the national U-19 championship with the club, but did not receive a professional contract at the end of his academy period, so he returned to third-tier Junak.

Following his first senior-level season playing in his hometown, he signed a 3 year contract with the Swiss second-tier team FC Wohlen in July 2014, but his contract was rescinded the following month as Barać couldn't get a Swiss work permit.

Barać then moved back to Croatia, signing with second-tier Hrvatski Dragovoljac for the remainder of the season, but missed most of it due to injury.

NK Šibenik
Barać joined second-tier Šibenik in the summer of 2015, which was at the time coached by Mirko Labrović, his fellow native from Sinj, playing regularly and almost qualifying for the first tier.

Osijek
On 1 July 2016, Barać joined Osijek for an undisclosed fee. Impressive display in the first half of the
Prva Liga earned him a call-up for Croatian A team for 2017 China Cup. On 3 August 2017, Osijek defeated the Dutch giants PSV Eindhoven in the third qualifying round of the 2017–18 UEFA Europa League with a 2-0 aggregate win. Many labeled Barać as the key member of the historic victory and Ajax eventually made a 2.5 million euros transfer bid. Osijek and Barać accepted, however the transfer was stopped due to Barać's heart issues revealed on the medical tests.

Rapid Wien
On 12 July 2018, he joined Rapid Wien for a fee of €1,300,000.

Sochi
On 19 June 2021, he moved to Russian club Sochi as a free agent.

Krylia Sovetov Samara
On 19 February 2022, he was loaned to Krylia Sovetov Samara until the end of the season with an option to buy.

On 31 May 2022, Barać moved to Krylia Sovetov on a permanent basis and signed a two-year contract.

Loan to Oostende
On 31 January 2023, Barać joined Oostende in Belgium on loan until the end of the season, with an option to buy.

Career statistics

Club

References 

1994 births
People from Sinj
Living people
Association football central defenders
Croatian footballers
Croatia international footballers
NK Hrvatski Dragovoljac players
HNK Šibenik players
NK Osijek players
SK Rapid Wien players
PFC Sochi players
PFC Krylia Sovetov Samara players
K.V. Oostende players
Croatian Football League players
First Football League (Croatia) players
Austrian Football Bundesliga players
2. Liga (Austria) players
Russian Premier League players
Croatian expatriate footballers
Expatriate footballers in Austria
Croatian expatriate sportspeople in Austria
Expatriate footballers in Russia
Croatian expatriate sportspeople in Russia
Expatriate footballers in Belgium
Croatian expatriate sportspeople in Belgium